is a Japanese skeleton racer who has competed since 1999. Competing in two Winter Olympics, she earned her best finish of 12th in the women's skeleton event at Salt Lake City in 2002.

Nakayama's best finish at the FIBT World Championships was 11th in the women's skeleton event at Königssee in 2004.

References
 2002 women's skeleton results (todor66.com)
 2006 women's skeleton results (todor66.com)

External links
 
 

1970 births
Japanese female skeleton racers
Living people
Olympic skeleton racers of Japan
Skeleton racers at the 2002 Winter Olympics
Skeleton racers at the 2006 Winter Olympics
People from Matsumoto, Nagano
20th-century Japanese women
21st-century Japanese women